Songs to a Swinging Band is a studio album recorded by U. S. Entertainer Connie Francis.

The album was recorded October 11 – 13, 1960 in New York under the musical direction of Richard "Dick" Wess.

The album was released in late 1960. Several of the album's songs were released in Asia on singles.

The closing track Swanee saw a limited single release in the U. S. when it was featured on MGM Records Single K 13005 as the B-side of Atashi-no, Francis' Japanese recording of Where the Boys Are.

Track listing

Side A

Side B

References

Connie Francis albums
1960 albums
MGM Records albums